This is a list of the lists of rulers and office-holders of Greece.

Mythology
Kings of Thebes

Antiquity
Kings of Athens
Archons of Athens
List of kings of Epirus
List of kings of Sparta
List of kings of Macedonia
List of Seleucid rulers
Ptolemaic Kings
 Kings of Kommagene
 Kings of Lydia
 Attalid Kings of Pergamon
List of Roman Emperors

Middle Ages
Byzantine Emperors
Emperors of Nicaea
Emperors of Trebizond
Despots of Epirus
Despots of Morea
Kings of Thessalonica
Princes of Achaea
Lords of Argos and Nauplia
Dukes of the Archipelago
Dukes of Athens
Dukes of Neopatria
Counts Palatine of Cephalonia and Zakynthos

Post-Byzantine era
Sultans of the Ottoman Empire
Beys of Mani
Lords High Commissioners of the Ionian Islands
Princes of Samos

Modern Greece
Kings of Greece
Heads of State of Greece
Regents of Greece
Heads of Government of Greece

References

Lists of European rulers
Rulers